Dao Khan is a village and tourist spot in Leepa Valley, Hattian Bala District of Azad Kashmir.

Rest houses of AJK Tourism & Archaeology Department and AJK Forest Department are located here for tourists stay. 

The village is accessible from Reshian by car and jeep.

References

Populated places in Jhelum Valley District
Hill stations in Pakistan
2005 Kashmir earthquake
Tourist attractions in Azad Kashmir
Villages in Jhelum Valley District